Fraternité Matin or Frat' Mat' is an Ivorian newspaper headquartered in Abidjan.

President of the Ivory Coast Félix Houphouët Boigny established the paper on 9 December 1964.

References

External links
 

Newspapers published in Ivory Coast
1964 establishments in Ivory Coast
Publications established in 1964